Solanum dolichorhachis is a species of plant in the family Solanaceae. It is endemic to Ecuador.

References

dolichorhachis
Endemic flora of Ecuador
Critically endangered flora of South America
Taxonomy articles created by Polbot